American rapper Azealia Banks has recorded songs for one studio album, one extended play (EP) and two mixtapes, as well as various other releases and guest appearances. Between 2009 and 2011, Banks uploaded several demo tracks on to the internet, including "Barbie Shit", "P-U-S-S-Y" and "Seventeen". These tracks caught the attention of XL Recordings, who subsequently signed a developmental record deal with Banks. In 2011, Banks self-released "212" as the lead single from her debut EP, 1991. "212" was a commercial success, peaking within the Top 40 of the regional charts in Ireland, Scotland, and the United Kingdom, later being certified platinum by the latter. The EP also spawned the single "Liquorice", which failed to mirror the success of its predecessor. In July 2012, Banks released a free nineteen-track mixtape titled Fantasea, which included collaborations with Shystie and Styles P. The mixtape received positive reviews from critics, with The Guardian commenting that it "showcase[s] an artist brimming with ideas".

Throughout 2013, Banks released various stand-alone tracks, including diss tracks to Angel Haze and Jim Jones,  a collaboration with Paul Oakenfold titled "Venus", and a promotional single with Pharrell titled "ATM Jam". In November 2014, after numerous delays, Banks' debut studio album, Broke with Expensive Taste, was released. The album spawned four singles, "Yung Rapunxel", "Heavy Metal and Reflective", "Chasing Time" and "Ice Princess". The singles had limited commercial impact compared to that of "212", with none   of them managing to break into any mainstream charts. To promote her album, a music video for the track "Wallace" was released, to widespread acclaim from critics. Banks' overall sound has been described as a mix of hardcore hip hop and indie pop, while her individual releases have been seen as house rap, witch hop, and dance pop records, respectively.

Songs

Notes

References

External links
 Azealia Banks at AllMusic

Banks, Azealia